John Atterbury (born 4 August 1941) is a British actor.

Filmography
 Doctor Who (TV series) (1968–1969) (4 episodes)
 The Mind Robber: Episode 1 (1968) 
 The Mind Robber: Episode 4 (1968)
 The Mind Robber: Episode 5 (1968)
 The War Games: Part 4 (1969)
 Scarlett (TV miniseries) (1988) (1 episode)
 Episode #1.4 as Clerk of the Court
 NASSER (1997)
 The Parent Trap (1998) as Gareth
 The Jump (TV series) (1998) (1 episode)
 Episode #1.1 as the judge
 Gosford Park (2001) as Merriman
 Harry Potter and the Order of the Phoenix (2007) as Phineas Nigellus Black
 Elizabeth: The Golden Age (2007) as the marriage priest
Midsomer Murders (2009)
 Episode: The Great and the Food as Mr Fuller
 Robin Hood (2010) as Exchequer
Love's Kitchen (2011)
 Darkest Hour (2017) as Sir Alexander Cadogan

References

External links

John Atterbury at Rotten Tomatoes

1941 births
Living people
British male film actors
British male television actors
20th-century British male actors
21st-century British male actors